Natalia Nikolaevna Zhdanova (Russian: Наталья Николаевна Жданова; born on February 6, 1964) is a Russian politician and Governor of Zabaykalsky Krai from February, 2016 to October, 2018. She resigned after receiving criticism for her handling of the region's social and economic difficulties and for not being able to maintain public support.

References

1964 births
Living people
Governors of Zabaykalsky Krai
People from Zabaykalsky Krai
Linguists from Russia
Women linguists
United Russia politicians
21st-century Russian politicians
Transbaikal State University alumni
Women heads of federal subjects of Russia
21st-century Russian women politicians